The 2022 King Cup Final was the 47th final of the King Cup, Saudi Arabia's main football knock-out competition since its inception in 1957.

The final was played at the King Abdullah Sports City in Jeddah, on 19 May 2022. The match was contested by Al-Fayha and Al-Hilal. It was Al-Fayha's 1st King Cup final and Al-Hilal's 17th. This was the first meeting between these two sides in the King Cup.

Al-Fayha won their first King Cup title by beating Al-Hilal on penalties following a 1–1 draw after extra time. In doing so, they became the 10th different team to win the King Cup. As winners of the competition, Al-Fayha qualified for the 2023–24 AFC Champions League qualifying play-offs.

Teams

Venue

The King Abdullah Sports City, also known as the Jewel Stadium, was announced as the venue of the final on 14 May 2022. This was the sixth time the King Abdullah Sports City hosted the final following those in 2014, 2015, 2016, 2017, and 2018 and was the fourteenth time it was hosted in Jeddah.

The King Abdullah Sports City was built in 2012, and opened in 2014 as the home of Al-Ahli, Al-Ittihad and the Saudi Arabia national team. Its current capacity is 62,345, and the record attendance was the opening match which was the 2014 King Cup final. The final also hosted many other finals including the 2019 Saudi Super Cup, the 2018 Supercoppa Italiana and the 2019–20 Supercopa de España.

Background
Al-Fayha reached their first final after a 1–0 home win against Al-Ittihad. Al-Fayha became the eleventh side to feature in a King Cup final.

Al-Hilal reached their 17th final after a 2–1 win against derby rivals Al-Shabab. This was Al-Hilal's second final in three years, and fifth final since the tournament was reintroduced. Al-Hilal won their three most recent finals against Al-Ahli once and Al-Nassr twice.

The two teams met twice earlier in the season with the first fixture ending in a draw and Al-Fayha winning the second fixture. This was the first meeting between these two sides in the King Cup and the 9th meeting between them in all competitions. In the clubs' 8 previous meetings, Al-Hilal won 4, Al-Fayha won 2 and the remaining 2 were drawn.

Road to the final
Note: In all results below, the score of the finalist is given first (H: home; A: away).

Match

Details

Statistics

See also

2021–22 King Cup
2021–22 Saudi Professional League
2022 Saudi Super Cup

References

External links

2022
Sports competitions in Saudi Arabia
May 2022 sports events in Asia
Al Hilal SFC matches